Romualdia is a genus of moths in the family Erebidae.

Species
Romualdia opharina (Schaus, 1921)
Romualdia chimaera (Rothschild, 1935)
Romualdia elongata (Felder, 1874)

References

Phaegopterina
Moth genera